Muraptal (Moraptal) is a rural locality (a village) in Muraptalovsky Selsoviet, Kuyurgazinsky District, Bashkortostan, Russia. The population was 41 as of 2010. There is 1 street.

Geography 
Muraptal is located 10 km southeast of Yermolayevo (the district's administrative centre) by road.

References 

Rural localities in Kuyurgazinsky District